2023 World Masters Athletics Indoor Championships is the ninth in a series of World Masters Athletics Indoor Championships (also called World Masters Athletics Championships Indoor, or WMACi). This ninth edition will take place in Toruń, Poland, from 25 to 31 March 2023.

This Championships was originally scheduled for 6-12 April, 2021 in Edmonton, Canada,

but due to the COVID-19 pandemic, it was repeatedly postponed, first to 2022,

then to 2023,

but that was also canceled when Athletics Alberta withdrew its sponsorship in April 2022.

The main venue is Arena Toruń, which has a banked six-lane indoor track

where the turns are raised to neutralize the centrifugal force of athletes running the curves. Supplemental venues include Municipal Stadium for throws, and Rudelka Park for Cross Country.

This Championships is organized by World Masters Athletics (WMA) in coordination with a Local Organising Committee (LOC)

headed by Michał Zaleski, Mayor of Toruń, and Wacław Krankowski, President of Polish Masters Athletics.

The WMA is the global governing body of the sport of athletics for athletes 35 years of age or older, setting rules for masters athletics competition.

A full range of indoor track and field events will be held.

In addition to indoor competition, non-stadia events will include Half Marathon, 8K Cross Country, 10K Race Walk,

Weight Throw, Hammer Throw, Discus Throw and Javelin Throw. New for the Championships will be a Mixed 4 x 200m Relay.

References

External links

World Masters Athletics Championships
International athletics competitions hosted by Poland
2023
Athletics World Masters Indoor Championships
Masters athletics (track and field) records
World Masters Athletics